Cornelis Adrianus "Kees" van Ieperen (born 15 January 1956) is a retired shooter from the Netherlands. He competed in Olympic skeet at the 1980 Summer Olympics and finished in 11th place.

References

1956 births
Living people
Dutch male sport shooters
Olympic shooters of the Netherlands
Shooters at the 1980 Summer Olympics
People from Lopik
Sportspeople from Utrecht (province)